Undermind is a science fiction television drama produced by ABC Weekend Television in 1965. It ran for eleven episodes of sixty minutes each. It starred Jeremy Wilkin, Rosemary Nicols and Denis Quilley.

The series was devised by Shoestring and Bergerac creator Robert Banks Stewart, who also went on to write for Doctor Who. Several other writers known for their work on Who also contributed scripts: David Whitaker, Bill Strutton and Robert Holmes.

Plot 
Personnel Officer Drew Heriot returns to the United Kingdom after working in Australia to discover his brother, Police Detective Frank Heriot, behaving oddly, to the distress of his sister-in-law Anne. Investigating together, they discover that a disembodied alien force is using high frequency signals to brainwash people—including Drew's brother—into committing subversive acts as a prelude to a full-scale invasion. Together, Drew and Anne battle to stop the acts of sabotage while trying to alert Britain to the danger...

Recurring cast
 Jeremy Wilkin as Drew Heriot (11 episodes (full series))
 Rosemary Nicols as Ann Heriot (11 episodes (full series))
 Denis Quilley as Professor Val Randolph (4 episodes: "Flowers of Havoc", "The New Dimension", "Death in England" and "Too Many Enemies")
 John Barron as Sir Godfrey Tillinger (2 episodes: "Waves of Sound" and "End Signal")
 David Phetheam as Caper (2 episodes: "Waves of Sound" and "End Signal")

Broadcasts
The series was not networked. ABC debuted the series on its Midlands and North franchise on Saturday May 8, 1965. The eleven episodes ran through to July 17. One week later ATV London began screenings. Strangely, ATV played episode 9 out of order, as the 4th episode in its sequence and only showed 10 episodes in all , declining to show "Song of Death".

Episodes

Release 
The series survived wiping and was released on DVD by Network on 23 July 2012.

References

External links 
 

1960s British science fiction television series
1965 British television series debuts
1965 British television series endings
Black-and-white British television shows
British science fiction television shows
English-language television shows
ITV television dramas
Television shows produced by ABC Weekend TV